The Asia/Oceania Zone was one of three zones of regional competition in the 2012 Fed Cup.

Group I
Venue: Shenzhen Luohu Tennis Centre, Shenzhen, China (outdoor hard)
Date: Week of 30 January (ties played 1–4 February)

The seven teams were divided into two pools of three and four teams. The winners of both pools played off to decide which nation progresses to World Group II play-offs. Nations finished last in each pool play-off to determine which nation was relegated to Asia/Oceania Zone Group II for 2013.

Pools

Play-offs

 advanced to World Group II play-offs.
 was relegated to Asia/Oceania Group II in 2013.

Group II
Venue: Shenzhen Luohu Tennis Centre, Shenzhen, China (outdoor hard)
Date: Week of 30 January

The ten teams were divided into two pools of five teams. The winners of both pools played off to decide which nation was promoted to the Asia/Oceania Zone Group I for 2013.

Pools

Play-offs 

 promoted to Asia/Oceania Group I in 2013.

See also
Fed Cup structure

External links
 Fed Cup website

 
Asia Oceania
Sport in Shenzhen
Tennis tournaments in China
Sports competitions in Guangdong